The hairy little fruit bat (Rhinophylla alethina) is a species of bat in the family Phyllostomidae found in Colombia and Ecuador. They are nocturnal creatures. They are listed as near-threatened by the IUCN.

References

Phyllostomidae
Mammals of Colombia
Mammals of Ecuador
Mammals described in 1966
Taxonomy articles created by Polbot
Bats of South America